Taichung station may refer to the following stations in Taichung, Taiwan:
 Taichung HSR station, a high speed rail station, adjacent to TRA Xinwuri station
 Taichung railway station, a station served exclusively by the Taiwan Railways Administration